Richard Peter Cassiano (October 7, 1917 – May 14, 1980) was a halfback in the National Football League. He played for the Brooklyn Dodgers during the 1940 NFL season. He died in 1980 at an Albany hospital. Cassiano was a member of the socalled "dream backfield" at the University of Pittsburgh in the 1930s.

References

Sportspeople from Albany, New York
Brooklyn Dodgers (NFL) players
American football halfbacks
Pittsburgh Panthers football players
1917 births
1980 deaths